Pyxidanthera is a genus of flowering plant in the family Diapensiaceae. The most widespread species, Pyxidanthera barbulata, is native to the eastern United States, occurring on the coast from Long Island to New Jersey and Virginia to South Carolina. A second species of Pyxidanthera is widely recognized, called Pyxidanthera brevifolia, known only from North and South Carolina. Some authors consider the two plants to be one species.

References

External links

Diapensiaceae
Ericales genera
Flora of the United States